Padur is a neighbourhood in Kanchipuram district of Tamil Nadu state in the peninsular India.

Padur is situated at about 2 km from Siruseri, one of the largest IT Parks in India.

Padur has a school viz., Hindustan International School. Also, it has an institution namely Hindustan Institute of Technology and Science (HITS) here in Padur.

Padur is served by a medical facility viz, Supreme Speciality Hospitals.

Krishnasamy alias Perumal Temple and Pazhandiyamman Temple here in Padur are under the control of Hindu Religious and Charitable Endowments Department Government of Tamil Nadu.

References 

Villages in Kanchipuram district